Michael Barry Lenard  (born May 20, 1955 in Chicago) is an American former handball player who competed in the 1984 Summer Olympics. Lenard is the vice president of the International Council of Arbitration for Sport, having joined the organisation in 1994. In 2017 the US Olympic Committee (USOC) bestowed their highest honour on him, an Olympic Torch Award. Lenard has served for the USOC a member and then Vice-Chair of the USOC Athletes’ Advisory Committee, as the Vice-President of the organisation.

References

1955 births
Living people
Sportspeople from Chicago
American male handball players
Olympic handball players of the United States
Handball players at the 1984 Summer Olympics